A moustache is a type of facial hair grown on the upper lip of a man.

Moustache can also refer to:

People and pets
Moustache (actor) (1929–1987), French actor and jazz drummer
Moustache (dog) (1799–1812), a French poodle said to have participated in the French Revolutionary Wars and Napoleonic Wars
Princesse Moustache (Princess Natalya Petrovna Galitzine, née Chernysheva or Chernyshyova; 1741–1837), a Russian noble and lady in waiting

Art, entertainment, and media

Film 
Moustache, a character in the 1963 film Irma La Douce
La Moustache (2005), a French film
Mustache (film), a 2023 Pakistani American film

Music

Groups
Mustasch, a rock group from Sweden

Albums
Moustache (album), a music album by British band Farrah
Moustache (Half a Scissor), a music album by French music producer Mr. Oizo

Songs
"Moustache" (song), a song by French band Twin Twin (2014)
"Mustache", a song by the country music band Heartland (2009)
"Moustache", a song by Sparks from album Angst in My Pants (1982)
"The Moustache Song", a song by Stephen Foster (1800s)

Literature
 Moustache (novel), a 2018 Indian novel by S. Hareesh

Computing and technology
Mustache (template system), a web template system
Moustache, a type of Canard (aeronautics)

See also